Safilguda originally named as Safilgudem before (1970's) is a residential locality in Neredmet neighbourhood of Hyderabad city. It falls under Malkajgiri mandal in Medchal-Malkajgiri district of Indian state of Telangana. It formed Ward No. 137 of Greater Hyderabad Municipal Corporation in 2009.

Popular Safilguda lake or formally Nadimi Cheruvu is located here. The boundary road around the lake is fashioned like the Tank Bund on the Hussain Sagar Lake and hence is also referred to as Safilguda mini tankbund. This is a popular attraction for the locals for jogging and evening-walks.

History
The early settlers of Safilgudem, who came around the 1960s/1970s, had a very tough time since this area was isolated with no means of transport to reach the city and no electricity. Gudem means "hamlet" or "village". In 1970s people had to bicycle around 6 km to reach the city unless they were able to get the occasional bus. There were only two or three houses and barren land and rock was everywhere. Earlier it was a hamlet called  Safilgudem and then it became a small town in Old Neredmet Village.

Subregions of Safilguda
Safilguda is divided into two major regions. Old Safilguda and Safilguda (New).

Old Safilguda
The old hamlet (Safilgudem) of Neredmet village is now known as Old Safilguda.

Colonies in Old Safilguda
 Santoshima Nagar Colony
 Old Safilguda
 Bharath Nagar
 Ganesh Nagar
 Lakshmi Nagar
 Creative Nagar
 PB Colony
 Safi nagar
 Dwarkamayi Colony
 Sudha Nagar
 Sainathpuram
 Pragathi Nagar
 Venkateshwara Nagar Colony
 Mahadevi colony

Safilguda (New) 
This area is in between Safilguda X road – Safilguda Railway station – Safilguda Pocket Complex(Defence Quarters) – Safilguda AOC – RK Nagar – Uttam Nagar – Balram Nagar - Chanakyapuri Region is known as (New) Safilguda. Earlier (1970's) called as Station Safilguda because Railway station near by area.

Safilguda is well connected with Roads
and Railways. Located at an approximate distance of 8 km from Secunderabad railway station and 4 km from Jubilee bus station.

Colonies in Safilguda (New) 
 Sharda Nagar
 Surya Nagar Enclave
 Chanakyapuri Colony
  RK Nagar
 Uttam Nagar
 Dayanand Nagar
 Chandragiri Colony
 Shiva Gowri Enclave
 Balramnagar

Radha Krishna Nagar is specifically a colony that took shape in the 1970s and is one of the well laid-out colonies out there. Uttam Nagar, Dayanand Nagar and Chanakyapuri have also been around since the 1970s.

These colonies became popular and a place of choice for Railway employees who purchased plots during the 1970s and constructed houses in the colonies.

Even now we can find the Railway employees settled in this part of city and their children working or settled in abroad. A sizeable population came from AP, local people and more importantly people came from Kerala settled here.

Commercial area
There are many shops in the area catering to all needs of the people. Outlets of major Retail chains such as Reliance, Fresh @, More. and others are available here.

All the amenities of a suburban town — medical, educational, shopping, offices, public transportation — are available. There are medical shops and hospitals that function round the clock. Educational institutions of the D.A.V group, Bharatiya Vidya Bhavan are prominent and within close proximity. Some colleges also function here like the Sri Chaitanya Malkajgiri branch, Narayana College, Malkajgiri branch etc.

Transport
Buses are run by TSRTC connecting it to all major parts of the city making them the most preferred mode of transportation here.

Transportion

Road transportation

Anandbagh X roads connects to various parts of the city. The public transport at this location provides connections to Uttam nagar, Mettuguda, ECIL, MaulaAli, Tarnaka and more.

Railway transportation
 Safilguda Railway station
It is the rail route between Secunderabad junction to Bollaram junction

Anandbagh crossroads facilitates connections to various parts of the city. The public transport at this location provides connections to Uttam Nagar, Alwal, ECIL, MaulaAli and more. Additionally, this junction also hosts Farmers market every Wednesday. The landmark is also famous for Venkateshwara Temple.
Suburban trains plying between Medchal, Bolarum to Secunderabad pass via Safilguda Railway Station but they always run late. On one side of the station is military cantonment area and the other side is civilian area coming under Ranga Reddy district.

You can also find a golf course next to Safilguda, but entry is restricted to military personnel only (Now there is no Golf course but the entire open area has been fenced up by military). The whole cantonment area provides a great relief to the joggers and walkers.

Safilguda is one of the most densely populated Middle/Upper class localities in the City today. While independent houses are more in this locality, many number of flats have also come up in and around Safilguda. However, one cannot say much about the design, look or aesthetics of the flats as most of them just present a boxy look.

References

External links
 Safilguda lake on WikiMapia

Neighbourhoods in Hyderabad, India